The Introduction and Allegro appassionato (Konzertstück) for piano and orchestra in G major, Op. 92, was composed by Robert Schumann in September 1849. It received its first performance in Leipzig on February 14, 1850, with Clara Schumann at the piano with Julius Rietz conducting. The work was published in 1852. The work takes around 15 minutes to perform.

Scoring 
The Introduction and Allegro appassionato is scored for solo piano, pairs of flutes, oboes, clarinets in B, bassoons, horns, trumpets and timpani, and strings.

Structure 
The work consists of two movements:

Notable recordings 
 Vladimir Ashkenazy (piano), London Symphony Orchestra and Uri Segal
 Daniel Barenboim (piano), London Philharmonic Orchestra and Dietrich Fischer-Dieskau
 Murray Perahia (piano), Berlin Philharmonic Orchestra and Claudio Abbado
 Sviatoslav Richter (piano), Warsaw National Philharmonic Orchestra and Stanislaw Wislocki
 András Schiff (piano), Vienna Philharmonic Orchestra and Christoph von Dohnányi
 Rudolf Serkin (piano), Philadelphia Orchestra and Eugene Ormandy

References

External links 

1849 compositions
Compositions by Robert Schumann
Compositions for piano and orchestra
Compositions in G major
Schumann